Lost in Love is the first extended play by South Korean singer Younha. The album was released on December 9, 2010.

Track listing
 기다리다 (waiting)
 말도안돼 (No Way/ Can't Believe It) - Personal Taste OST
 원샷 (One Shot Ft. Ju Seok)
 꿈속에서 (In My Dreams) - Pokémon: Zoroark: Master of Illusions OST
 내 남자친구를부탁해 (Please Take Care Of My Boyfriend) (lyrics written by Hwayobi)

Notes

External links 
 Younha Official Korean Website
 Younha Official Japanese Website

2010 EPs
Younha albums